Michael Moran may refer to:

Sport
 Michael Moran (golfer) (1886–1918), Irish golfer
 Michael Moran (rugby league) (born 1983), Australian rugby league player
 Mickey Moran, Gaelic footballer and manager
 Mike Moran (footballer) (born 1935), English soccer player

Politicians
 Michael Moran (Massachusetts politician), Democratic member of the Massachusetts House of Representatives
 Mícheál Ó Móráin (1912–1983), Irish Fianna Fáil politician from County Mayo
 Mike Moran (politician), former Democratic member of the Ohio House of Representatives

Others
 Michael Moran (journalist) (born 1962), new media journalist and broadcaster, editor of CFR.org
 Michael Moran (music producer) (born 1948), English keyboard musician and producer
 Michael Moran (Tuam) (1893–1920), shot dead while in the custody of the Royal Irish Constabulary
 Michael Moran (writer), Australian travel writer
 Michael J. Moran (c. 1794–1846), popularly known as Zozimus, Irish street rhymer
 Michael P. Moran (1944–2004), American actor and playwright
 Michael T. Moran, United States Navy admiral 
 Mike Moran (wrestler), American professional wrestler

See also
 Micky Moran, the human alter ego of Marvelman
 Mickey Moran, a character in the film Babes in Arms